Euxoa atomaris is a moth of the family Noctuidae first described by Smith in 1890. It is found in North America from North Dakota, southern Alberta and British Columbia, south to central New Mexico, Arizona and southern California.

The wingspan is 30–34 mm. Adults are on wing in July to September.

Subspecies
Euxoa atomaris atomaris
Euxoa atomaris detesta
Euxoa atomaris esta

References

Euxoa
Moths of North America
Moths described in 1890